Wendy Cracked a Walnut: Original Soundtrack Recording is the soundtrack album from the 1990 Australian film Wendy Cracked a Walnut.

Album information 
This CD features music by the composer Bruce Smeaton.

Reception 
The soundtrack was well received by fans of Bruce Smeaton's music. His ground-breaking synthesized score for Wendy Cracked a Walnut's soundtrack was nominated for an ARIA Award in 1991 for Best Soundtrack / Cast / Show Album.

Track listing 
 Opening Titles
 Queen of Slink
 Wendy Walnut
 Move Them Feet
 One Dark Night
 Breathless
 Closing Credits
 Midnight Rainbow
 Fax of Life
 Antoine's
 Love Is a Market
 So Slow
 That Sinking Feeling

Credits 
Recording producers – Bruce Smeaton and Joe Chindamo
Executive producer – Philip Powers
Artwork – Bruce Bath
Mastering – Meredith Brooks

References

Comedy film soundtracks
1991 soundtrack albums